The 1873 East Staffordshire by-election was fought on 6 August 1873.  The byelection was fought due to the death of the incumbent MP of the Liberal Party, John Robinson McClean.  It was won by the Conservative candidate Samuel Allsopp, who defeated the Liberal candidate, John Jaffray, by 3.630 votes to 2,893.

References

1873 in England
1873 elections in the United Kingdom
By-elections to the Parliament of the United Kingdom in Staffordshire constituencies
19th century in Staffordshire